Máire Ní Reachtagáin (died 5 February 1706/7), was a Gaelic poet.

Biography
Úna Ní Bhroin was a Gaelic poet. She married Seán Ó Neachtain, poet and scholar. They had three children, Tadhg, Lúcás, and Anna, and lived in the Liberties near Thomas Street in Dublin. She wrote about 1670 and died on February 5 in either 1706 or 1707. She was believed to be a friend of Máire Ní Reachtagáin and a relation of Edmund Byrne, archbishop of Dublin 1707–24.

Sources

1700s deaths
Irish poets